Erik Pfeifer (born 22 January 1987) is a German professional boxer who has held the WBO European heavyweight title since 2019. As an amateur he won bronze medals at the 2011 and 2013 World Championships and competed in the 2012 and 2016 Olympics.

Amateur career
He won his first medal in 2005, as he won the bronze medal at the Junior European Championship, in 2009 he won the Europe Championship which is not to be confused with the European Amateur Boxing Championships. In 2011, he won another bronze medal, but this time at the World Championships at super-heavyweight. He lost the semi-final to Anthony Joshua as he suffered a broken nose in the first round and as a result, the fight was stopped.

At the 2012 Summer Olympics, he lost to eventual bronze medalist, Ivan Dychko, in the first round.

At the 2016 Summer Olympics in Rio de Janeiro, he was defeated in the first round of the super-heavyweight class by Clayton Laurent Jr. of the Virgin Islands.

Professional boxing record

References

External links
 
 
 

1987 births
Living people
People from Vechta (district)
Boxers at the 2012 Summer Olympics
Boxers at the 2016 Summer Olympics
Olympic boxers of Germany
German male boxers
AIBA World Boxing Championships medalists
Heavyweight boxers
Super-heavyweight boxers
Sportspeople from Lower Saxony